The 2021 Cambodian Second League will be the fourth season of Cambodian Second League, the second-tier of Cambodian football. It was first started off in 2016 by the Football Federation of Cambodia.
A total of eight teams will play each other a single round robin matches. The winner will promote to 2022 Cambodian League.However, due to the new policies and regulations implemented by the newly established Cambodian League Company; none of the 
teams from the 2021 Second League season would be promoted to the first division because they had failed to meet the licensing requirements.

Teams

League table

Results

Season statistics

Top scorers
As of 11 December 2021.

Clean sheets
As of 11 December 2021.

Awards

References

External links
 Cambodian Second League seasons

Cambodian Second League
Football competitions in Cambodia